Angus Reid may refer to:
Angus Reid (born 1976), Canadian Football League (CFL) player
Angus Reid (market research), Canadian CEO of market research company
Angus Reid Public Opinion, international public affairs practice